The 1953 Danish parliamentary election can refer to one of three Danish parliamentary elections held in 1953:

1953 Danish general election, the first general election held under the new constitution
1953 Danish Folketing election, held on  21 April 1953 alongside the Landsting election
1953 Danish Landsting election, the last election held for the Landstinget